
Gmina Kazimierz Biskupi is a rural gmina (administrative district) in Konin County, Greater Poland Voivodeship, in west-central Poland.

Villages
Gmina Kazimierz Biskupi contains the villages and settlements of Anielewo, Bielawy, Bochlewo, Bochlewo Drugie, Borowe, Cząstków, Daninów, Dębówka, Dobrosołowo, Dobrosołowo Drugie, Dobrosołowo Trzecie, Jóźwin, Kamienica, Kamienica-Majątek, Kazimierz Biskupi, Komorowo, Komorowo-Kolonia, Kozarzew, Kozarzewek, Ludwików, Marantów, Mokra, Nieświastów, Olesin, Olszowe, Posada, Radwaniec, Smuczyn, Sokółki, Stefanowo, Tokarki, Tokarki Drugie, Tokarki Pierwsze, Warznia, Wieruszew, Wierzchy, Włodzimirów, Wola Łaszczowa and Wygoda.

Neighbouring gminas
Gmina Kazimierz Biskupi is bordered by the city of Konin and by the gminas of Golina, Kleczew, Ostrowite, Ślesin and Słupca.

References
Polish official population figures 2006

Kazimierz Biskupi
Konin County